Jelena Dokić was the defending champion, but lost to  Amanda Coetzer in the second round.

Magdalena Maleeva won the title, defeating Lindsay Davenport in the final 5–7, 6–3, 7–6(7–4).

Seeds
A champion seed is indicated in bold text while text in italics indicates the round in which that seed was eliminated. The top four seeds received a bye to the second round.

  Venus Williams (second round)
  Jennifer Capriati (withdrew)
  Lindsay Davenport (final)
  Jelena Dokić (second round)
  Amélie Mauresmo (semifinals)
  Martina Hingis (first round)
  Anastasia Myskina (first round)
  Silvia Farina Elia (first round)
  Elena Dementieva (second round)

Draw

Finals

Top half

Bottom half

External links
 Kremlin Cup Draw

Kremlin Cup
Kremlin Cup